The 2021–22 season was Al-Shabab's 45th non-consecutive season in the top flight of Saudi football and 75th year in existence as a football club. The club participated in the Pro League, the King Cup and the AFC Champions League.

The season covered the period from 1 July 2021 to 30 June 2022.

Players

Squad information

Out on loan

Transfers and loans

Transfers in

Loans in

Transfers out

Loans out

Pre-season

Competitions

Overview

Goalscorers

Last Updated: 23 June 2022

Assists

Last Updated: 23 June 2022

Clean sheets

Last Updated: 27 June 2022

References

Al Shabab FC (Riyadh) seasons
Shabab